The Sunshine Football Club, nicknamed Kangaroos, is an Australian rules football club which compete in the Western Region Football League since 1978. They are based in the Melbourne suburb of Braybrook.

History
Formed as the Sunshine YCW Football Club in 1959 as a junior club. They joined the "YCW National Football Association" playing its first senior game was in 1963. After winning three premierships in the YCW NFA, the club transferred to the Footscray Districts Football League in 1978.

After losing consecutive Grand Finals in 1994 and 1995 in A2 grade the club was promoted to A1 grade (division 1) in 1996 and have remained in the top level of the competition ever since.

At the end of the 2000 season with the change in the League's name the club followed suit by dropping the YCW from its title.

Competitions and Premierships
 YCW National Football Association (1963-1977)
 1966 (B grade), 1969 (B grade), 1976 (A grade)
  Footscray District Football League (1978-1999)
 Nil
 Western Region Football League (2000-2019)
 Nil

VFL/AFL players
 David Darcy -

References

External links
Official website

Book

History of the WRFL/FDFL – Kevin Hillier - -  
History of football in Melbourne's north west - John Stoward -  

Western Region Football League clubs
Australian rules football clubs in Melbourne
Australian rules football clubs established in 1959
1959 establishments in Australia
Sport in the City of Maribyrnong
Sunshine, Victoria